Great Prince's, Tsar's and Emperor's Hunting in Russia is a book by Russian historian Nikolai Kutepov published from 1896 to 1911.

Table of contents 
 Book One (1896)
 Book Two (1898)
 Book Three (1902)
 Book Four (1911)

Book illustrations

External links
 Т. 1: Великокняжеская и царская охота на Руси с X по XVI век. 
 Т. 2: Царская охота на Руси царей Михаила Федоровича и Алексея Михайловича. XVII век. 
 Т. 3: Царская и императорская охота на Руси. Конец XVII и XVIII век. 
 Т. 4: Императорская охота на Руси. Конец XVIII и XIX век. 
 Иллюстрации и художественное оформление очерков Н. И. Кутепова «Великокняжеская, царская и императорская охота на Руси». Власова Р. И. 

1896 non-fiction books
Hunting literature
Russian encyclopedias
Russian-language encyclopedias